This is a list of lighthouses in Wallis and Futuna.

Lighthouses

See also
 Lists of lighthouses and lightvessels

References

External links
 

Lighthouses
Buildings and structures in Wallis and Futuna
Transport in Wallis and Futuna
Wallis and Futuna